Pomaderris betulina, commonly known as birch pomaderris, is a species of flowering plant in the family Rhamnaceae and is endemic to south-eastern continental Australia. It is a shrub with hairy young stems, lance-shaped to oblong or elliptic leaves, and yellowish flowers.

Description
Flowering occurs from October to November.

Taxonomy
Pomaderris betulina was first formally described in 1833 by William Jackson Hooker from an unpublished description by Allan Cunningham and the description was published in the Botanical Magazine. The specific epithet (betulina) refers to a similarity of the leaves of this species to those of birch genus, Betula.

In 1997, Neville Walsh and Fiona Coates described two subspecies of P. betulina and the names are accepted by the Australian Plant Census:

Distribution and habitat
Birch pomaderris grows in forest, woodland and shrubland, often near streams, from near Torrington in New South Wales to north-eastern Victoria. Subspecies actensis is restricted to a few locations in the Australian Capital Territory and to near Burrinjuck in New South Wales.

References

andromedifolia
Flora of Queensland
Flora of New South Wales
Flora of Victoria (Australia)
Taxa named by Allan Cunningham (botanist)
Plants described in 1825